Sudesh Bhosale is an Indian playback singer who primarily sings for Bollywood films. Bhosale is known for his ability to mimic actor Amitabh Bachchan, having sung for him in various films.

Career 
Bhosale was born on 1 July 1960 to Sumantai Bhosale and studied in Ambedkar College, Wadala. He got his first major break in playback singing in the film Zalzala (1988). He used mimicry to become a professional dubbing artist for several artists like Sanjeev Kumar and Anil Kapoor.

He dubbed for Sanjeev Kumar when he died prematurely before completing the film Professor Ki Padosan. He has sung songs for the movie Ghatothkach in 2008.

Bhosale is the producer and judge on K For Kishore, a singing contest on Sony Entertainment Television. He has sung many famous Bollywood songs for Amitabh Bachchan including "Jumma chumma de de" from 1991 movie Hum, "Meri Makhna Meri Soniye" from Baghban and others. He mimicked for Amitabh Bachchan in movies such as Family.

He can also mimic numerous Bollywood stars including Ashok Kumar (Dadamoni), Amitabh Bachchan, Vinod Khanna, Anil Kapoor, Sunil Dutt and others.

Accolades
He has been awarded the Mother Teresa Millennium Award for his contribution to music in a ceremony in Kolkata in 2008.

Personal life

Sudesh Bhosale is married to Hema Bhosle. They have one son named Siddhant and a daughter named Shruti.

Discography

Hindi non-film songs

References

External links
 

Living people
Bollywood playback singers
Indian male playback singers
Indian male voice actors
Singers from Maharashtra
Marathi people
Amitabh Bachchan imitators
1960 births